The 2015 Coleman Vision Tennis Championships was a professional tennis tournament played on outdoor hard courts. It was the eighteenth edition of the tournament and part of the 2015 ITF Women's Circuit, offering a total of $75,000 in prize money. It took place in Albuquerque, New Mexico, United States, on 21–27 September 2015.

Singles main draw entrants

Seeds 

 1 Rankings as of 14 September 2015

Other entrants 
The following players received wildcards into the singles main draw:
  Jan Abaza
  Julia Boserup
  Victoria Duval
  Julia Jones

The following players received entry from the qualifying draw:
  Robin Anderson
  Ulrikke Eikeri
  Michaëlla Krajicek
  Amra Sadiković

The following player received entry by a protected ranking:
  Lisa Whybourn

Champions

Singles

 Michaëlla Krajicek def.  Naomi Broady, 6–7(2–7), 7–6(7–3), 7–5

Doubles

 Paula Cristina Gonçalves /  Sanaz Marand def.  Tamira Paszek /  Anna Tatishvili, 4–6, 6–2, [10–3]

External links 
 2015 Coleman Vision Tennis Championships at ITFtennis.com
 Official website

2015 ITF Women's Circuit
2015
COleman